Tiyo (T'í'o,  or طع) is a coastal town in east-central Eritrea, the capital of the Are'eta district in the Southern Red Sea region.  Nearby towns and villages include Anrata (0.6 nm), Ad Gaban (6.3 nm), Sahli (8.0 nm), Babaiu (15.4 nm) and Faraon (17.9 nm).

References
Tiyo, Eritrea

Southern Red Sea Region
Populated places in Eritrea